Human Fly was the nickname of numerous stunt entertainers of the 20th century who would scale the exteriors of tall buildings in the United States:

 Harry Gardiner (born 1871, active 1905–1929) in the U.S., before moving to Europe.
 "Steeplejack" Charles Miller (active 1900–1910)
 George Polley (active 1910–1920)
 Henry Roland
 John Ciampa (active 1942–1952)
 George Willig, who climbed New York City's World Trade Center in 1977.

The Human Fly can also refer to:
 Rick Rojatt, a costumed Canadian stunt rider active in the 1970s 
 Human Fly (comics) is also the name of two fictional characters in Marvel comic books (one of whom was based on Rojatt).
 "Human Fly (song)", a 1978 song by The Cramps.
 the activity of Velcro jumping.
 a 1972 album by Richard Thompson titled Henry the Human Fly.
 The Human Flies, a crime novel by Hans Olav Lahlum